The Democratic United National Front (pronounced Prajathanthrvadi Eksath Jathika Peramuna) is a political party in Sri Lanka.

DUNF was founded in 1990 by a group of United National Party dissidents. The party was led by Lalith Athulathmudali, Gamini Dissanayake who shared a joint presidency and G. M. Premachandra.

On April 23, 1993, Lalith Athulathmudali was shot dead during an election campaign rally. The DUNF then split and Lalith's widow, Srimani Anoma Athulathmudali, launched the Democratic United National Lalith Front as a separate political party.

At the legislative elections, held on 2 April 2004, the party was part of the United People's Freedom Alliance that won 45.6% of the popular vote and 105 out of 225 seats.

In December 2009 the DUNF joined the United National Front led by the UNP. However, in February 2010 they left the UNF in order to join the Democratic National Alliance.

1990 establishments in Sri Lanka
Political parties established in 1990
Political parties in Sri Lanka